Anda is a Latvian feminine given name. The associated name day is 20 November.

Notable people named Anda
Anda Eibele (born 1984), Latvian basketball player
Anda Rožukalne, Latvian journalist
Anda Šafranska (born 1960), Latvian chess player
Anda Zaice (born 1941), Latvian actress

References 

Latvian feminine given names
Feminine given names